A money clip is a device typically used to store cash and credit cards in a very compact fashion for those who do not wish to carry a wallet.

Metal 

A metal money clip is generally a solid piece of metal folded into half, such that the banknotes and credit cards are securely wedged in between the two pieces of metal. Metal money clips are typically made out of brass, stainless steel, silver, gold, titanium, or platinum. They are typically sold as luxury items. The chief disadvantage of a metal money clip is that, due to the inflexibility of the metal, it cannot typically hold large amounts of cash. Depending on the design, it may also be difficult to push the banknotes into the clip.

Carbon fiber 

Carbon fiber money clips are starting to see market acceptance. Using advanced moulding techniques, the high strength and durability of carbon fiber make for ideal qualities. The carbon fiber allows the clamping surfaces to open beyond parallel, without the deformation of normal metal money clips. However, it can be too loose when holding less, so there is a tradeoff. Being non-metallic, they still conduct electrical current (due to the carbon fibers), so they can be picked up by metal detectors (you can test this out with a handheld security metal detector).  The softer resin (plastic that bonds the carbon fibers together) means that it get scratched more easily than the tougher surface of metal money clip.

Magnetic 
The magnetic money clip is generally made of two strong flat rectangular or round magnets encased in leather, with a small piece of leather separating the two pieces and allowing them to swivel into a closed and open position. There are also clips made of three magnets and two pieces of leather. A magnetic money clip typically has a greater carrying capacity than a metal money clip and the strongest clips are able to hold up to 15 banknotes folded in half.  When holding a larger volume of banknotes a magnetic money clip has less clamping force, since the magnets are farther apart compared to when holding just a few banknotes.  A metal or carbon fiber clip has inverse properties and the clamping tension gets higher as the clip is stretched open further.  Magnetic money clips are not recommended for holding credit cards as the magnets may distort or erase the magnetic strip.

Money clip wallet
A money clip wallet is a clip designed specifically to hold both credit cards and cash. The conventional money clip wallets are a credit card holder with either a swivel magnetic clip attached to the back side or a solid clip that is bent 6-fold; bent that way the conventional clip will feature three compartments instead of one. Money clip wallets are sometimes known as hybrid money clips.

See also
 Wallet

References

Fashion accessories
Money containers